This article describes about the squads for the 2014 African Women's Championship.

Group A

Ivory Coast
The squad was announced on 19 September 2014.

Head coach: Clémentine Touré

Namibia
The squad was announced on 2 October 2014.

Head coach: Jaqueline Shipanga

Nigeria
The squad was announced on 30 September 2014.

Head coach: Edwin Okon

Zambia
The squad was announced on 5 October 2014.

Head coach: Charles Bwale

Group B

Algeria
The squad was announced on 26 September 2014.

Head coach: Azzedine Chih

Cameroon
The squad was announced on 4 October 2014.

Head coach: Enow Ngatchou

Ghana
The squad was announced on 27 September 2014.

Head coach: Yusif Basigi

South Africa
The squad was announced on 30 September 2014.

Head coach: Vera Pauw

References

squads
Women's Africa Cup of Nation's squads